Stars Aligned is the fourth studio album by the Finnish progressive rock band Von Hertzen Brothers. It was released on 21 March 2011 in Finland and 23 March 2011 in the United Kingdom.

Track listing

2011 albums
Von Hertzen Brothers albums